Billings Field is a park located in West Roxbury, Massachusetts that is operated by the City of Boston.  It is located in the heart of West Roxbury and in close proximity to Centre Street.  The park is home to two playgrounds, three baseball diamonds, and a basketball court.

References

Parks in Boston